Halman is a surname of English and Turkish origin.

List of people with the surname 

 James Halman (died 1702), Master of Gonville and Caius College, Cambridge
 Abdullah Halman (born 1987), Turkish footballer
 Ella Halman (1906–1995), English opera singer
 Greg Halman (1987–2011), Dutch baseball player
 Talât Sait Halman (born 1931), Turkish poet
 Tim Halman, Canadian politician

See also 

 Harman (surname)
 Holman (surname)

Surnames
Surnames of English origin
Surnames of Turkish origin
Surnames of British Isles origin